Villa Hidalgo, Oaxaca may refer to:
Chalcatongo de Hidalgo, part of the Tlaxiaco District, Mexico
Hidalgo Yalalag, near Villa Alta District, Mexico
Villa Hidalgo Municipality, Oaxaca

See also
Villa Hidalgo (disambiguation)